Middlebrook 7H11 agar is identical to Middlebrook 7H10 agar, with an addition of pancreatic digest of casein to facilitate the growth of fastidious cultures of M. tuberculosis.

Mycobactin J may also be added to Middlebrook 7H11 agar to allow the recovery of M. genavense.

See also
 Lowenstein-Jensen medium
 Middlebrook 7H9 broth

References

External links
 Middlebrook 7H11 Agar

Microbiological media